Steven Craig Alker (born 28 July 1971) is a professional golfer from New Zealand who plays on the PGA Tour Champions, where he has won five events. He won the season-long 2022 Charles Schwab Cup on the PGA Tour Champions.

Early life and professional career
Alker was born in Hamilton, New Zealand.

Alker turned professional in 1995 and has competed on several tours around the world. He has been a member of the PGA Tour of Australasia since 1995. He played on the European Tour in 1998 and 1999, also competing on Europe's developmental Challenge Tour in 1999. In 2000, he won the Canadian Tour Order of Merit, before moving to the United States to compete on the Nationwide Tour in 2002. He was successful enough to graduate to the full PGA Tour in 2003, but was unable to retain his card and returned to the development tour from 2004 to 2006. In 2007 and 2008, he went back to Europe to play on the European and Challenge tours. He returned to the Nationwide Tour (now Web.com Tour) in 2009.

At the 2014 Cleveland Open on the Web.com Tour, Alker beat Dawie van der Walt on the 11th playoff hole, a tour record for longest playoff. He finished 20th in the Web.com Tour Finals to earn his PGA Tour card for the 2014–15 season.

In 2016, Alker played in The Open Championship after tying for second place in the Final Qualifying event held at the Royal Cinque Ports Golf Club.

In November 2021, Alker won the TimberTech Championship on the PGA Tour Champions in Boca Raton, Florida. With the win, Alker had earned $896,207 in nine senior tournaments after turning 50 years of age in July 2021. This amount was more than he made in his PGA Tour career. Alker continued this form into the 2022 season, recording wins at the Rapiscan Systems Classic and the Insperity Invitational. He also finished runner-up at the Mitsubishi Electric Championship at Hualalai and the ClubCorp Classic; losing in a playoff on both occasions.

In May 2022, Alker won his first senior major championship at the 2022 KitchenAid Senior PGA Championship at The Golf Club at Harbor Shores in Benton Harbor, Michigan. Alker shot a final round 63 to win the championship by three strokes. This was his third win in five starts and fourth in 19 as a senior.

In November 2022, Alker finished third at the Charles Schwab Cup Championship which secured him first place in the season-long Charles Schwab Cup and the $1,000,000 first prize. He also won the Arnold Palmer Award for the season-long money title and the Byron Nelson Award for the lowest scoring average for the 2022 season.

Professional wins (16)

PGA Tour of Australasia wins (3)

1Co-sanctioned by the Nationwide Tour

PGA Tour of Australasia playoff record (0–1)

Web.com Tour wins (4)

1Co-sanctioned by the PGA Tour of Australasia

Web.com Tour playoff record (3–1)

Canadian Tour wins (2)

Australasian Development Tour wins (1)

Other wins (2)
1995 Fiji Open
1996 Tahiti Open

PGA Tour Champions wins (5)

PGA Tour Champions playoff record (0–2)

Results in major championships

CUT = missed the half-way cut
"T" = tied

Results in senior major championships

"T" indicates a tie for a place

Team appearances
Amateur
Eisenhower Trophy (representing New Zealand): 1990, 1994
Nomura Cup (representing New Zealand): 1991, 1993
Sloan Morpeth Trophy (representing New Zealand): 1990, 1991, 1992 (winners)

Professional
Dunhill Cup (representing New Zealand): 1997

See also
2002 Buy.com Tour graduates
2006 European Tour Qualifying School graduates
2014 Web.com Tour Finals graduates
2016 Web.com Tour Finals graduates
List of golfers with most Web.com Tour wins

References

External links

New Zealand male golfers
PGA Tour of Australasia golfers
PGA Tour golfers
European Tour golfers
PGA Tour Champions golfers
Winners of senior major golf championships
Korn Ferry Tour graduates
Sportspeople from Hamilton, New Zealand
People from Fountain Hills, Arizona
Sportspeople from the Phoenix metropolitan area
1971 births
Living people